Hobson is an English and Danish patronymic surname. Originating in the Scandinavian Denmark the surname found its way to England, and Iceland in the Viking Era evolving from Son of Hrod (Hróður) to Hobson.

People
 Allan Hobson (1933–2021), American psychologist and professor of psychiatry
 Barry Hobson (1925–2017), Northern Irish cricketer and educator
 Bulmer Hobson (1883–1969), Northern Irish writer and Irish nationalist
 Butch Hobson (born 1951), American baseball manager and former player
 Charles Hobson, Baron Hobson, British politician
 Charles Hobson (trade unionist) (1845–1923), British trade unionist
 Darington Hobson (born 1987), American basketball player
 Dave Hobson (born 1936), American politician and lawyer
 David Hobson (tenor) (born 1969), Australian opera singer
 Dorothy Hobson (born 1946), Jamaican and West Indies cricketer
 E. W. Hobson (1856–1933), English mathematician
 Edward H. Hobson (1825–1901), American merchant, banker, politician, tax collector, railroad executive and Civil War brigadier general
 Edward Hobson (botanist) (1782–1830), English weaver and botanist
 Frederick Hobson (1873–1917), Canadian soldier posthumously awarded the Victoria Cross
 Frederick Taylor Hobson (1840–1909), British Army major-general
 Gary Hobson (born 1972), English former footballer
 George Andrew Hobson (1854–1917), British civil engineer and bridge builder
 George Hobson (footballer) (1903–1993), English footballer
 George Hobson (wrestler), New Zealand wrestler who won a bronze medal at the 1950 British Empire Games
 Harold Hobson (1904–1992), English drama critic and author
 Henry Hobson (1891–1983), American Episcopal bishop
 Howard Hobson (1903–1991), American college basketball and baseball coach and basketball player
 Jason Hobson (born 1983), English rugby union player
 J. A. Hobson (1858–1940), English economist and liberal
 Julius Hobson (1922–1977), American politician
 Laura Z. Hobson (1900–1986), American novelist
 M. K. Hobson (born 1969), American speculative fiction/fantasy writer
 Mark Hobson (spree killer) (born 1969), English murderer
 Mary Hobson (curler), American curler
 Mellody Hobson (born 1969), American businesswoman, chairwoman of Starbucks and former chairwoman of DreamWorks Animation
 Michael Z. Hobson (1936–2020), American publisher and executive vice president of Marvel Comics
 Mike Hobson, British television producer
 Peter Hobson, English psychology professor
 Richmond P. Hobson (1870–1937) U.S. Navy admiral, Medal of Honor recipient, and congressman from Alabama
 Richmond P. Hobson Jr. (1907–1966), American-Canadian writer
 T. Frank Hobson (1900–1966), Justice of the Florida Supreme Court
 Theo Hobson (born 1972), British theologian
 Thomas Hobson (postal carrier) (c. 1554–1631), English stable manager responsible for origin of the phrase "Hobson's choice"
 Valerie Hobson (1917–1998), British actress, wife of John Profumo
 Victor Hobson (born 1980), American football player
 Wilder Hobson (1906–1964), American writer and editor
 William Hobson (1792–1842), first Governor-General of New Zealand
 William Hobson (born 1991), birth name of professional wrestler Powerhouse Hobbs

Fictional characters
 Christopher Hobson, a character in Star Trek: The Next Generation
 Gary Hobson, leading character of the television series Early Edition
 Henry Hobson, title character of the 1915 play Hobson's Choice and various film adaptations
 Dr. Laura Hobson, a recurring character in the UK television series Inspector Lewis and Inspector Morse

See also
 General Hobson (disambiguation)
 Senator Hobson (disambiguation)
 Hopson

English-language surnames
Surnames of English origin
Patronymic surnames
Surnames from given names